The United Nations Educational, Scientific and Cultural Organization (UNESCO) designates World Heritage Sites of outstanding universal value to cultural or natural heritage which have been nominated by countries which are signatories to the UNESCO World Heritage Convention, established in 1972. Cultural heritage consists of monuments (such as architectural works, monumental sculptures, or inscriptions), groups of buildings, and sites (including archaeological sites). Natural features (consisting of physical and biological formations), geological and physiographical formations (including habitats of threatened species of animals and plants), and natural sites which are important from the point of view of science, conservation or natural beauty, are defined as natural heritage. Mongolia ratified the convention on 2 February 1990. 

, Mongolia has five sites on the list. The first site, the Uvs Nuur Basin, was listed in 2003. The most recent site, the Landscapes of Dauria, was listed in 2017. These two sites are natural and transnational sites; they are shared with Russia. The other three sites are cultural. In addition, Mongolia has 12 sites on the tentative list.

World Heritage Sites 
UNESCO lists sites under ten criteria; each entry must meet at least one of the criteria. Criteria i through vi are cultural, and vii through x are natural.

Tentative list 

In addition to sites inscribed on the World Heritage List, member states can maintain a list of tentative sites that they may consider for nomination. Nominations for the World Heritage List are only accepted if the site was previously listed on the tentative list. , Mongolia has listed 12 properties on its tentative list.

Deer Stone Monuments, the Heart of Bronze Age Culture (2014)
Petroglyphic Complexes in the Mongolian Gobi (2014)
Highlands of Mongol Altai (2014)
Sacred Mountains of Mongolia (2015)

References

World Heritage Sites
Mongolia
 
World Heritage Sites